John Hodge (born 1 April 1969) is an English former professional footballer who played as a right winger.

He went on trial with Manchester United from November 1989 to December 1989. While at Swansea, he was a part of the team that won after a penalty shoot-out in the 1994 Football League Trophy Final. He joined Gillingham in July 1998.

His only league goal was a second-half injury-time equaliser against Macclesfield on 3 October 1998. He was regarded as a "supersub", often coming off the bench to great effect, including setting up Robert Taylor for a last-minute goal against Fulham on 28 November 1998, and Andy Thomson for a 100th-minute winner against Walsall in a FA Cup replay on 8 January 2000.

He was the only Gillingham player to successfully convert a penalty in their 3–1 penalty shoot-out defeat to Manchester City in the 1998–99 Division Two play-off final. Hodge was signed by Kidderminster Harriers in January 2003.

Honours
Individual
PFA Team of the Year: 1997–98 Second Division

Notes

1969 births
Living people
People from Ormskirk
English footballers
Association football wingers
Falmouth Town A.F.C. players
Exeter City F.C. players
Swansea City A.F.C. players
Walsall F.C. players
Gillingham F.C. players
Northampton Town F.C. players
Kidderminster Harriers F.C. players
English Football League players